Spierer is a surname. Notable people with the surname include:

 Céline Spierer, Swiss screenwriter
 Lauren Spierer (born 1991), American missing person